St. Xavier's High School, Fort, is a private Catholic primary and secondary school for boys located in Fort, Mumbai, India. The English medium school was founded in 1869 and is run by the Society of Jesus.

History

First century 
The school was built when the Bombay port took on new importance as the "Gateway to India", in the same year as the Suez Canal was built, 1869. At that time it incorporated primary students from the Jesuit St. Mary’s on Cavel Street that had been opened in 1860. By 1870 there were eight years of school and a seminary on the premises, with boarding facilities for the St. Mary’s boys and seminarians. The 512 students came from diverse religious backgrounds: 337 Catholic, 98 Hindus, 45 Parsis, 20 other Christians, ten Muslims, and two Jews. The top floor became the Jesuit residence, then housing sixteen Jesuits.

Music was taught from 1873 – singing, the harmonium, piano, flute, and violin. A band followed in 1878. Cricket was played at the school since 1874 and football from 1896. German fathers founded and ran the school, but during World War I they were sent to concentration camps; Jesuits from Tarragona Spain and some from Switzerland filled in for them. In 1936, five graduates were in the top twenty among 7,014 successful candidates who passed the Matriculation Examination. In 1940 the East Wing was completed to accommodate the upper standards, including a hall with a capacity for 700. In 1948 a night school was opened with members of the Catholic Young Men’s Sodality as staff; it soon had an enrollment of 200 for courses like fitting and mechanics.

Memorabilia 
St. Xavier's occupies the neo-gothic building it had from its foundation by the Jesuits in 1869. Fragments of its history are visible in the corridors of the primary section in the form of stuffed hunted animals shot by priests during the British Raj.  Notable among these is the butterfly and bird collection on the first floor and the stuffed tiger on the third floor. The tiger was donated by the Maharaja of Vanzra, Gujrat, who attended St. Xavier's. The butterfly and bird collection is the work of Brother Navarro, a Spanish Jesuit and a naturalist who was associated with the school. At one corner of the primary quadrangle is a section of a ship's propeller which landed there at the time of the Bombay Harbour Explosion of 1944. St. Xavier's High School is approaching its 150th jubilee.

Education 
St. Xavier's follows the SSC board which is the state board of the Government of Maharashtra. It runs classes from standard one to standard ten. The primary (standard one to four) and secondary school occupy different buildings. A class has four sections (A to D) with about fifty students per section.

All students of the secondary school belong to one of four houses - Claver (blue), Gonzaga  (yellow), Britto (red), Berchmans (green). These were earlier known as Ashoka (blue), Tilak (yellow), Nehru (red), and Tagore (green). Each house has an elected House Captain from standard ten and a Vice-Captain from standard nine. Additionally, a School Captain and Vice-Captain are elected from standard ten. There is a sports captain and a sports vice captain also. These student representatives maintain student discipline and lead student and ceremonial activities.

Principals 
The following individuals have served as principal of the school:

Notable alumni
 

 Arjun Appadurai - anthropologist
 Somnath Bharadwaj - Indian theoretical physicist
 Ashok Chavan - former Chief Minister of Maharashtra
 Charles Correa - architect
 Nari Gandhi - architect  
 Sunil Gavaskar - captain of Indian cricket team
 Rais Khan - musician
 Deepak Parekh - banking
 Gautam Rajadhyaksha - photographer
 Julio Ribeiro - Police Commissioner of Mumbai, DGP Punjab, Ambassador to Romania
 Homi Sethna - scientist
 Aham Sharma - actor
 Aftab Shivdasani - actor
 Sidharth Shukla - actor 
 Soli Sohrabjee - Attorney General of India
 Adi Godrej - Indian businessman and industrialist
 Milind Rege - former Indian first-class cricketer
 Tiku Talsania -  Indian film and television actor

See also

 List of Jesuit schools
 List of schools in Mumbai

References

External links 

 Videos of school

Jesuit secondary schools in India
Jesuit primary schools in India
Boys' schools in India
Christian schools in Maharashtra
High schools and secondary schools in Mumbai
Educational institutions established in 1869
1869 establishments in India